The Mud Fire was a wildfire north of Litchfield, Lassen County, California in the United States. It was fully contained on September 1. The fire was caused by lightning.

The fire

The Mud Fire was first reported on August 29 at 2:30 pm. The fire, located east of US Route 395 and north of Litchfield, was started by lightning and was fueled by rangeland grass, sagebrush and juniper. A total of 13 fire personnel fought the fire.

Impact

No structures of infrastructure were damaged by the Mud Fire, however, significant habitat for the greater sage-grouse was destroyed.

References

2017 California wildfires
History of Lassen County, California
Wildfires in Lassen County, California